Augustin Kubizek (15 October 1918 – 24 March 2009) was an Austrian choir conductor and composer. He was the oldest son of August Kubizek, who was a childhood friend of Adolf Hitler.

Works, editions and recordings 
 Gaudia matris – on collection Jakobs Stern ist aufgegangen CD Carus Verlag

References 

Austrian male composers
Austrian composers
1918 births
2009 deaths
Musicians from Vienna
20th-century male musicians